The Lifan 520 is a subcompact sedan produced by the Lifan Motors division of Lifan Group.

Overview
The Lifan 520 is the first car produced by Lifan Motors, and was launched at the 2006 Beijing Auto Show. The exterior and interior are specific to the 520 but the car is based in the chassis of the 1991 Citroën ZX. The 520 is a four-door sedan and the 520i is the 5-door hatchback version.

Powertrain
The Lifan 520 is powered by a choice of three 4-cylinder engines: the 1.3 L (1342cc) and 1.6 L (1587cc) Lifan engines producing  and  respectively; and the Tritec  1.6 L (1596cc) engine shared with the last-generation Mini.

Markets
The Lifan 520 is sold in China and in several export markets. In Russia, it is sold as the Lifan Breez.

Gallery

References

External links
Lifan Motors website

520
Cars introduced in 2006
2010s cars
Cars of China